Vassili Alexandrovich Davidenko (born 3 July 1970 in Tbilisi) is a Russian-American former cyclist, who currently works as the team manager and Senior Vice President of Athletics for UCI ProTeam .

In 1999, Davidenko moved to the United States and changed to American citizenship. After retiring from cycling, he became manager of the  cycling team in 2007.

Major results

1988
2nd Junior World Road Race Championships
1991
 Peace Race
1st Stages 3 & 4
1992
1st Gran Premio della Liberazione
1995
1st Stage 10 Tour DuPont
1996
1st  National Road Race Championships
1st Stage 1 Tour de Pologne
1997
6th Overall Tirreno–Adriatico
1998
1st  National Cyclo-cross Championships
1999
1st Stgae 5 Cascade Classic
2nd National Road Race Championships
3rd Overall Tour de Toona
1st Stage 5
2000
 Tour de Beauce
1st Stages 1, 2 & 4b
2nd Overall Tour de Toona
2001
1st Stage 2 Sea Otter Classic
1st Stage 6 Giro d'Abruzzo
2nd Overall Tour de Toona
1st Stages 2 & 4 
3rd Clarendon Cup
2002
1st Clarendon Cup
2nd Grand Prix de Rennes
2003
1st Stage 5b Tour de Beauce
2004
3rd CSC Invitational
2005
1st Stage 4b Tour de Beauce

References

External links

1970 births
Living people
Russian male cyclists
Olympic cyclists of Russia
Cyclists at the 1996 Summer Olympics
Sportspeople from Tbilisi
American male cyclists
Directeur sportifs
Russian emigrants to the United States